Mi Shivajiraje Bhosale Boltoy (English: I'm Shivajiraje Bhosale Speaking) is a 2009 Indian Marathi-language film produced by Sanjay Chhabria along with Ashwami Manjrekar and directed by Santosh Ramdas Manjrekar. The film follows an underdog who fights against the evil in society, to re-instate his identity and keep his pride.

Plot
Dinkar Maruti Bhosale represents thousands of Maharashtrians, who feel they have lost their identity in the cosmopolitan Mumbai. Dinkar feels Mumbai is in Maharashtra but there is no Maharashtra left in Mumbai. He always complains about the lack of respect a Maharashtrian receives in Mumbai and feels he is victimized everywhere because he is a Maharashtrian; little realizing that he himself has brought this situation upon himself.

In a state of sheer frustration Dinkar gets up one day cursing himself for being born a Marathi. He feels his ancestors must have committed a heinous crime for him to be born a Marathi.

These outbursts of Dinkar reach Pratapgad and the spirit of Chhatrapati Shivaji Maharaj is aroused. Dinkar has to now face a seething Shivaji Maharaj, who is furious at him. Shivaji Maharaj fires Dinkar for his shallow thinking and tells him he has to command respect, not demand it. He blames Dinkar's thinking for the sorry state of Maharashtrians. "Before blaming other communities for your shortcomings, look within and see if you have done anything to keep the Marathi pride intact," he roars.

Dinkar realizes his mistake but does Shivaji Maharaj's thought rouse him to rectify his mistakes? The film ends with Bhonsle gladly returning the sword at the shrine of Chhatrapati Shivaji Maharaj.

Cast
 Mahesh Manjrekar as Chhatrapati Shivaji Maharaj
 Sachin Khedekar as Dinkar Bhosale
 Makarand Anaspure as Raiba
 Siddhartha Jadhav as Usman Parker
 Suchitra Bandekar as Sumitra Bhosale
 Priya Bapat as Shashikala Bhosale
 Pradeep Patwardhan as BMC Head Officer
 Abhijeet Kelkar as Rahul Bhosale
 Vineet Kumar Singh as Dubey tenant to Dinkar Bhosale and Taxi Driver
 Kishore Pradhan as V. Gopalkrishnan, Branch Manager
 Vidyadhar Joshi as Ramniklal Gosalia
 Meghana Erande as Press / TV Reporter
 Kamlesh Sawant as ACP Rege
 Reema Lagoo as Jijabai
 Atul Kale as Gidwani/Gaikwad, Film Director
 Jaywant Wadkar as Goon of Gosalia
 Ganesh Yadav as Nandkumar Chandekar
 Dhananjay Mandrekar as  Kadam BMC Inspection Officer
 Sanjay Khapre as Hiroji Indulkar (Guest Role)
 Bharat Dabholkar as General Afzal Khan - Special appearance in Powada Song
 Bharat Jadhav as Powada presenter - Special appearance as Powada presenter
 Ankush Chaudhari- Special appearance in song "Masoli"

Soundtrack
The song O raje marked the debut of Sukhwinder Singh in Marathi film industry.

Box office
Me Shivajiraje Bhosale Boltoy was a huge blockbuster at the box office. It held the record of highest-grossing movie for many years until the release of Duniyadari which broke its record by collecting  at the box office.

Remake 
The film was remade in Bengali as Ami Shubhash Bolchi (2011), directed by the original film's lead actor Mahesh Manjrekar with Mithun Chakraborty and Anindya Banerjee.  But the film's main character was replaced and slightly changed with environment.

See also
 Highest grossing Marathi films

References

External links 
 Official Website ( Company Store link) 

2009 films
Shivaji
Marathi films remade in other languages
Cultural depictions of Shivaji
2000s Marathi-language films